Kill Yr Idols is an EP by American alternative rock band Sonic Youth. It was released in October 1983, originally only in Germany, by record label Zensor.

Release 

Kill Yr Idols was released in October 1983, originally only in Germany.

"Shaking Hell" was recorded live at the Plugg Club in New York City, October 15, 1983.

In 1995, the tracks on Kill Yr Idols not found on 1983's Confusion Is Sex were appended to the DGC reissue of that album.

Reception 

Jason Birchmeier of AllMusic commented, "These songs resemble the ones on Confusion Is Sex, except that they're a bit more developed, especially the title track and 'Brother James'. [Kill Yr Idols] results in a fascinating wade through Sonic Youth's early flashes of genius."

Track listing

References

External links 

 

1983 EPs
Albums produced by Wharton Tiers
Sonic Youth EPs
No wave EPs